Dark Heart may refer to:
 Dark Heart (TV series), a British television crime drama series
 The name of a villain in Care Bears
 Dark Heart, a novel in the Dragonlance fictional campaign setting; see List of Dragonlance novels
 "Dark Heart", an episode of Justice League Unlimited showcasing The Atom
 "Dark Heart" (Voltron: The Third Dimension)
 Operation Dark Heart, a 2010 memoir by U.S. Army intelligence officer Lt. Col Anthony Shaffer
 Dark Hearts, an independent film starring Kyle Schmid and Sonja Kinski